Pécsi Vasutas Sportkör is a water polo club from Pécs, Hungary. The team competes in the Országos Bajnokság I.

Team

Squad changes for the 2015-16 season

In
 Erik Csacsovszky (from Honvéd)
 László Surányi (from Kaposvár)
 Patrik Macsi (from UVSE)
 Zlatko Rakonjac (from Szentes)
 Ivan Basara (from Radnički Kragujevac)

Out
 

Squad for the 2013–14 season

Technical staff

Recent seasons

Rankings in OB I

In European competition
Participations in Euro Cup (LEN Cup): 1x

Notable former players

Olympic champions
Zoltán Kósz (2004–2007) - 3 year  2000 Sydney
Attila Vári (2009–2011) - 2 year  2000 Sydney, 2004 Athens

Coaches
 Tamás Ambrus (2004 – 2010)
 Attila Petik (2010 – 2013)
 Miklós Bereczki (2013 – 2015)
 Gergely Lukács (2015 – present)

References

External links
 

Water polo clubs in Hungary